Simhadripuram is a village in YSR Kadapa district of the Indian state of Andhra Pradesh. It is located in Simhadripuram mandal of Pulivendula revenue division. Simhadripuram is the birthplace of late Telugu film actor Basavaraju Venkata Padmanabha Rao.

Geography
It has an average elevation of 228 meters (751 feet). It also has Bhanu Kota under its revenue jurisdictional purview which has the great Lord Shiva temple near to Ravulakolanu village.

References 

Villages in Kadapa district